Harrisburg School District is a public school district that serves the city of Harrisburg, Oregon, United States, and the surrounding rural area of Benton, Linn, and Lane counties.

The district consists of three schools: Harrisburg Elementary School, Harrisburg Middle School, and Harrisburg High School. Total enrollment for the district is approximately 939.

References

External links
Harrisburg School District 7 (official website)

School districts in Oregon
Education in Benton County, Oregon
Education in Lane County, Oregon
Education in Linn County, Oregon